The word monnieri (uncapitalized) is a specific epithet for animal and plant species meaning "of Monnier" or "of Le Monnier", and was used to commemorate one of several people having these surnames. Some species with the epithet are:

In botany
Bacopa monnieri - water hyssop
Cnidium monnieri - Monnier's snowparsley
Stachys monieri - alpine betony

In zoology
Enigmaticolus monnieri - a sea snail